Merges may refer to:
 Merger
 Mérges, a village in Hungary